"Tell Me U Luv Me" is a song by American rappers Juice Wrld and Trippie Redd. It was released on May 29, 2020 through Grade A Productions under exclusive license to Interscope Records, as the second single for Juice Wrld's posthumous third studio album, Legends Never Die.

Background 
Juice Wrld first performed the song with Trippie Redd at a concert in late 2019. In January 2020, "Tell Me U Luv Me" was leaked on SoundCloud before being taken down on copyright grounds. In February, the track resurfaced on YouTube. Later, Trippie Redd and Juice Wrld's label both took to Instagram to tease the track a few hours before it was officially released.

The song was released on the birthday of Juice's girlfriend Ally Lotti, who teased lines from the track in less than an hour prior to its release. Juice Wrld finished the last verse for the song only a few days prior to his passing.

Music video 
The official music video was released on May 28, 2020. Directed by Cole Bennett, it is filmed in half-animation and half-live action, and features sketches and drawings of "high school doodles". Trippie Redd is shown performing against a "crumpled-up paper background", while Juice appears via archive footage from his old music videos, which were also filmed and directed by Bennett. The video also shows clips of Juice Wrld's girlfriend, Ally Lotti, rapping some of Juice's parts in the video.

Charts

Certifications

References 

2020 singles
2019 songs
Juice Wrld songs
Trippie Redd songs
Songs written by Juice Wrld
Songs written by Trippie Redd
Songs written by Nick Mira
Interscope Records singles
Music videos directed by Cole Bennett
Songs released posthumously
Alternative R&B songs
Pop-rap songs